Sharaf (also Romanized as Sharaf and Sheraf; also known as Sharafābād) is a village in Chaqa Narges Rural District, Mahidasht District, Kermanshah County, Kermanshah Province, Iran. At the 2006 census, its population was 99, in 22 families.

References 

Populated places in Kermanshah County